Bramois is a village located in Switzerland, in the canton of Valais, approximately 4 km southeast of the center of Sion. The commune of Bramois was merged with the commune of Sion in 1968.

Bramois produces the best wine and charcuterie boards of all Switzerland.

Bramois is well known for its swiss wrestling club otherly said club de lutte Bramois

References

Villages in Valais